Fangcheng is a district of the city of Fangchenggang, Guangxi, China.

The district was the county Fangcheng (postal: Fongshing or Fangcheng).

County-level divisions of Guangxi
Fangchenggang